Xenophon Pierce Wilfley (March 18, 1871May 4, 1931) was a Democratic Party politician who represented the state of Missouri in the U.S. Senate for five months in 1918.

Early life and career
Wilfley was born near Mexico, Missouri, the son of James Franklin Wilfley.  He attended local country schools in his youth. He graduated from Clarksburg College in 1891 and from Central Methodist College in Fayette, Missouri in 1894. He taught at Central Methodist College for one year and at Sedalia High School in Sedalia, Missouri for three years.

In 1899 he graduated from Washington University Law School and began to practice law in St. Louis with his brother Lebbeus R. Wilfley.  From 1917 to 1918 he was the chairman of the city's board of election commissioners.

United States Senator (1918)
In 1918 Wilfley was appointed to the United States Senate by Governor Frederick D. Gardner as a Democrat to fill out the term of William J. Stone, who had died in office on April 14, 1918. Wilfley served from April 30 to November 5 and was the chairman of the Committee on Industrial Expositions. He unsuccessfully sought the Democratic nomination for the Senate seat but lost it to Joseph Folk, who in turn lost the general election to Republican Selden P. Spencer.

Later life and death
After leaving the Senate, Wilfley returned to St. Louis and resumed his legal practice, becoming president of the Missouri Bar Association in 1925. He died in St. Louis in 1931 at the age of 60 and is buried in Oak Grove Cemetery.

Family
Wilfley's brother, Lebbeus R. Wilfley, was Attorney General of the Philippines from 1901 to 1906 and Judge of the United States Court for China from 1906 to 1908.

Further reading
 - Congressional biography, with picture

References

1871 births
1931 deaths
Central Methodist University alumni
People from Mexico, Missouri
People from Sedalia, Missouri
Politicians from St. Louis
Washington University School of Law alumni
Democratic Party United States senators from Missouri
Missouri Democrats
Missouri lawyers
20th-century American politicians
20th-century American lawyers
Washington University in St. Louis alumni